Arriva TrainCare (formerly LNWR) is a railway rolling stock maintenance company. Formed in 1993 by Pete Waterman, it is a subsidiary of Arriva UK Trains.

History
In 1993, Pete Waterman formed LNWR to provide maintenance for locomotives and rolling stock for specialist and charter operators from premises in Crewe. In 1999, it began maintaining rolling stock for train operating companies. In 2004 a facility in Leeds was opened to service Freightliner Class 66s, this was later sold to Freightliner.

In November 2008, LNWR was sold to Arriva UK Trains. Following a restructure, DB Schenker's facilities in Bristol, Cambridge, Eastleigh and Newcastle also became part of LNWR.

Today as well as servicing trains for Arriva UK Trains subsidiaries, it services rolling stock for Bombardier Transportation (CrossCountry and Avanti West Coast Class 220/221 Voyagers), Freightliner (Class 86s and 90s) and Siemens (West Midlands Trains Class 350s). It also conducts heavy overhauls on rolling stock.

References

Arriva Group companies
Transport companies established in 1993
1993 establishments in England